Bjørnsonfjellet is a mountain in Nordenskiöld Land at Spitsbergen, Svalbard. It has a height of 932 m.a.s.l. and is part of Kolspissfjella. It is located north of Grøndalen. The mountain is named after Bjørnstjerne Bjørnson, recipient of the Nobel Prize in Literature.

References

Mountains of Spitsbergen